Cnephasitis meyi is a species of moth of the family Tortricidae. It is found in northern Vietnam. The habitat consists of primary cloud forests.

The wingspan is about 24 mm for males and 28 mm for females. The ground colour of the forewings is grey to the middle and slightly tinged brownish in the distal part. There are dark grey spots and strigulae (fine streaks). The markings are dark grey with blackish grey marks and rust suffusions. The hindwings are brownish grey. Females have a paler ground colour and the distal part of the forewings is brownish grey. Adults have been recorded on wing in October and November.

Etymology
The species is named in honour of Dr. Wolfram Mey.

References

Moths described in 2008
Polyorthini